The Cressy-class cruiser was a class of six armoured cruisers built for the Royal Navy around 1900. Their design’s incorporation of a pair of 9.2-inch guns and armoured sides served to address criticism directed against the previous  — advances made possible by their 1,000 ton increase in displacement over their predecessors. The ships were notably stable, except for a susceptibility to pitching.

Service
Until 1908, the ships served in Home waters, the Mediterranean and the Far East. On the outbreak of the First World War Cressy, Aboukir, Hogue, Bacchante and Euryalus formed the Seventh Cruiser Squadron. Due to the obsolescence of the ships and because they were crewed by inexperienced reservists the squadron was known as the "Live Bait Squadron". This epithet proved prophetic when Cressy, Hogue and Aboukir were sunk in a single action on 22 September 1914 by the German submarine U-9 near the Dutch coast. After the first cruiser had been hit, the following cruisers both came to a dead halt to pick up survivors, making themselves easy targets for torpedoes.

Ships

HMS Cressy: launched 4 December 1899, torpedoed and sunk 22 September 1914
HMS Sutlej: launched 18 November 1899, scrapped  9 May 1921
HMS Aboukir: launched 16 May 1900, torpedoed and sunk 22 September 1914
HMS Hogue: launched 13 August 1900, torpedoed and sunk 22 September 1914
HMS Bacchante: launched 21 February 1901, scrapped 1 July 1920
HMS Euryalus: launched 20 May 1901, scrapped 1 July 1920

Building Programme

The following table gives the build details and purchase cost of the members of the Cressy class.  Standard British practice at that time was for these costs to exclude armament and stores.  The compilers of The Naval Annual revised costs quoted for British ships between the 1905 and 1906 editions.

Image gallery

Notes
1. All three  ships Cressy, Hogue and Aboukir were sunk under an hour by the German submarine SM U-9.

Footnotes

Bibliography 
 Brassey, T.A. (ed) The Naval Annual 1904
 
 

 
 Leyland, J. and Brassey, T.A. (ed)The Naval Annual 1906

External links

Loss of HMS Aboukir, Cressy and Hogue
Cressy class description

Cruiser classes
 
Ship classes of the Royal Navy